Union Bryarly's Mill is a historic flour and grist mill complex and national historic district located at Darkesville, Berkeley County, West Virginia. It encompasses four contributing buildings and two contributing sites.  The buildings are the Bryarly Mill, Mansion House, log smokehouse and combination ice house building, log miller's house (1751), site of a distillery, and foundation containing archaeological remains.  The mill was built about 1835, and is a two-story, three-bay brick building with a gable roof. The Mansion House was built about 1835, and is a two-story, L-shaped frame dwelling on a stone foundation.

It was listed on the National Register of Historic Places in 1980.

References

National Register of Historic Places in Berkeley County, West Virginia
Historic districts in Berkeley County, West Virginia
Industrial buildings completed in 1835
Buildings and structures in Berkeley County, West Virginia
Flour mills in the United States
Historic districts on the National Register of Historic Places in West Virginia
Grinding mills in West Virginia
Grinding mills on the National Register of Historic Places in West Virginia